Never Mind the Horrocks was a one-off television show built around the talents of British television comedian Jane Horrocks. It was broadcast on Channel 4 on Thursday 19 September 1996 at 10:00pm and also starred Martin Clunes, Mel Giedroyc, Rebecca Front, David Haig, Alexander Armstrong, and Philip Pope, with a special guest appearance by Angela Rippon. Its name is a pun on the Sex Pistols album Never Mind the Bollocks.

External links
Never Mind the Horrocks at the bbc.co.uk Guide to Comedy
Official Hat Trick Productions Website Hat Trick 

Channel 4 comedy
British television films